Ayadaw Township  is a township in Monywa District in the Sagaing Division of Myanmar. The principal town is Ayadaw.

References

External links
Maplandia World Gazetteer - map showing the township boundary

Townships of Sagaing Region